Pullanviduthi is a village in Alangudi, Tamil Nadu, India.

The majority of its population works in the agriculture industry.

Geography

Pullanviduthi lies near Vadakadu, in an area consisting mostly of red soil.

Etymology

Economy
The primary exports of Pullanviduthi are crops and dairy products.

Nearest villages and towns
Vadakadu
Peravurani
Avanam
Neduvasal

Nearest railway stations
Peravurani railway station
Thanjavur railway station

Villages in Pudukkottai district

new:अलंगुडी